Michel Burgener (born 1 June 1949) is a retired Swiss professional male tennis player.

Career
Michel Burgener won Swiss Indoors in  1972 and he was a member of the Switzerland Davis Cup team.

References

External links
 
 
 

Living people
Swiss male tennis players
1949 births